The following are the association football events of the year 1898 throughout the world.

Events
January 1: Footballing arm of Belgian club K.A.A. Gent established.
April 5: Portsmouth founded
May 8: Genoa become the first ever Italian national champions
May 12: French club Tourcoing FC founded (as US Tourcoing)
December: French club Union Sportive Boulonnaise founded at Boulogne-sur-Mer.
Italian Football Federation is founded

National champions

Argentina: Lomas Athletic Club
Belgium: FC Liégeois
England: Sheffield United
France: Standard Athletic Club
Ireland: Linfield

Italy: Genoa (first Italian champions)
Netherlands: RAP Amsterdam (first Eredivisie champions)
Scotland:
Divions One: Celtic
Scottish Cup: Rangers
Sweden: Örgryte IS
Switzerland: Grasshopper Zurich (unofficial)

International tournaments
1898 British Home Championship (February 19 – April 2, 1898)

Births
January 7 – Dick MacNeill, Dutch footballer (d. 1963)

Deaths
June 30 – Reg Birkett, English footballer

Clubs founded
 K.A.A. Gent
 Portsmouth FC
 BSC Young Boys
 SV Darmstadt 98
 Crosshaven AFC

References 

 
Association football by year